Zagoréta is a village in western Ivory Coast. It is in the sub-prefecture of Gadouan, Daloa Department, Haut-Sassandra Region, Sassandra-Marahoué District.

Until 2012, Zagoréta was in the commune of Zagoréta-Gadouan. In March 2012, Zagoréta-Gadouan became one of 1126 communes nationwide that were abolished.

Notes

Populated places in Sassandra-Marahoué District
Populated places in Haut-Sassandra